The Devon School is a fictional school created by author John Knowles in the novels A Separate Peace and Peace Breaks Out. It is based on Knowles' alma mater, Phillips Exeter Academy. Like Phillips Exeter during World War II, Devon is a boys' boarding school in New Hampshire. Knowles places the school in a town that bears its name, specifically at the head of a quaint residential street called Gilman Street. The school "emerged naturally from the town which had produced it." A Separate Peace covers the summer of 1942 and the Winter Session of 1942-1943. The senior year students are being prepared for the war. The timeframe in Peace Breaks Out is 1945-1946. In both of these books, Devon is portrayed as a boys' preparatory school, just as Phillips Exeter was at the time; although Phillips Exeter is today a co-educational school. The Devon School is one of the most prominent fictional examples of a total institution.

Description 
The approach from Gilman Street gradually gives way to the Far Common, a leafy, manicured expanse of ground that proceeds the First Academy Building, which Knowles derives almost entirely from the Academy Building at Phillips Exeter, having the same cupola and similar Latin inscription over the entrance. The First Academy Building, the Georgian red brick dormitories, and the Gothic-style chapel, form a quadrangle around the Center Common. There is then a group of Colonial houses for the Dean, the Headmaster, and other faculty members, along an old London-style lane leading from the dormitories to the Naguamsett River and the Crew House. Progressing in another direction, past the Field House (or "The Cage") the Center Common opens onto the Playing Fields, with tennis courts on the left, the Devon Woods on the right, and enormous open grounds for playing football, lacrosse and soccer. Directly ahead, far across the Playing Fields, is the stadium (which envelops the swimming pool), the Devon River and the climactic tree that is the basis for a very crucial part of the plot. Beyond all that, Knowles names the excess wilderness as the Fields Beyond.

The town of Devon, as described by Knowles, is of course very similar to the real-life Exeter, New Hampshire and the Devon River and the Naguamsett River are based on the Exeter River and the Squamscott River. Exactly like its real-life basis, the fresh-water Devon River eventually falls into the tidal Naguamsett, a marshy, mud-banked saline body of water that eventually connected to the ocean. The two rivers were separated by a dam and a small waterfall.

Dormitories 
 Pembroke House (with the basement-level 'Butt Room,' for smoking)
 Veazy Hall
 Saltonstall Hall

Faculty, A Separate Peace 
 Mr. Prud'homme - substitute for the Summer Session
 Mr. Patch-Withers - substitute Headmaster for summer 1942
 Mr. Ludsbury - a Winter Session master who is in charge of one of the dormitories (like a housemaster at a British public school)
 Dr. Stanpole - who also appears in Peace Breaks Out, is the infirmary doctor
 Mr. Carhart
 Mr. Horn - Latin master
 Phil Latham - the wrestling coach

Students, A Separate Peace 
 Phineas (Finny) - an athletically gifted student and Gene's best-friend
 Gene Forrester - an introverted, intelligent boy; accused of making Finny fall
 Elwin "Leper" Lepellier - the eccentric witness to the plot's tragedy; enlisted into the army and went AWOL
 Chet Douglass - Gene's brightest academic competition
 Bobby Zane
 Brownie Perkins - Brinker Hadley's antisocial roommate during the Winter Session
 Cliff Quackenbush - manager of the school rowing crew
 Brinker Hadley - Senior, leads the Trial

Faculty, Peace Breaks Out 
 Peter Hallam - an alumnus from the Class of 1937, the main character of the story, and who returns to teach Physical Education and American History after serving in World War II
 Roscoe Bannerman Latch - head of the Latin department
 Dr. Wherry - the Headmaster

Students, Peace Breaks Out (Class of 1946) 
 Cotty Donaldson - captain of the football team, president of the senior class
 Perkins
 Wexford
 Nicholas "Nick" Blackburn
 Tug Blackburn
 Eric Hochschwender
 Ernie Manero
 Rob Willis
 Gene DelliGatti
 Parker
 Sol Abrahamson
 Peavy Pierson
 Billy Carruthers

Footnotes 

Fictional schools
Phillips Exeter Academy